The Federated Miscellaneous Workers' Union (F.M.W.U.), commonly known as the 'Missos', was an Australian trade union which existed between 1915 and 1992. It represented an extremely diverse and disparate range of occupations, but its core support came from workers employed in cleaning and security services.

Formation 

The union was first established on 6 May 1910 as the Watchmen, Caretakers and Cleaners Union of New South Wales (W.C.C.U.), which was created by the Organising Committee of the New South Wales Labor Council. The task of organisation was a difficult one due to the casualised and isolated nature of the occupations covered. Under the leadership of the first Secretary of the WCCU, Joe Coote, the union adopted a pragmatic approach to increasing union membership by including any workers not already represented by trade unions, such as paintmaking employees. To reflect the growing range of industries represented in 1915 the union changed its name to the Federated Miscellaneous Workers' Union.

Growth 

After steady growth over the first half of the century, including winning paid sick leave, annual leave and a forty-hour week, the union really took off in the 1950s. A new rank-and-file leadership led by Ray Gietzelt took over to create a vibrant, member-driven union.
Famous campaigns during the 1950s and 60s included organising workers paid to be Santa Clauses at Christmas and a group of dance instructors who were locked out for four months before winning their jobs back. In the late 1960s the FMWU absorbed the membership of the defunct Australian Leather and Allied Trades Employees' Federation.

The strength of the "Missos" grew over these years, with membership increasing from 25,000 in 1955 to 88,000 by 1975.  Ray Gietzelt remained General Secretary from 1955 to 1984.

Amalgamation 

In 1992 the FMWU amalgamated with the Federated Liquor and Allied Industries Employees' Union of Australia to form the Liquor Hospitality and Miscellaneous Workers' Union (LHMU), later renamed United Voice.

References

External links 
 United Voice The website of United Voice, the successor to the Federated Miscellaneous Workers' Union.

Defunct trade unions of Australia
Trade unions established in 1910
Trade unions disestablished in 1992